Horácio José Paredes Mota Gonçalves (born 25 December 1962) is a Portuguese retired footballer who played as a forward, currently a manager.

Playing career
Gonçalves was born in Guimarães. He was a youth player at hometown club Vitória S.C. and played his only Primeira Liga season with them in 1985–86, scoring once in ten appearances. He spent the bulk of his career in the Segunda Liga, achieving figures of 234 games and 69 goals for six teams, including two spells at AD Fafe.

Coaching career
Having retired with third-division club Varzim S.C. in 1994 he became their manager, overseeing consecutive promotions to reach the top flight in 1997. He also managed G.D. Chaves in that league immediately after, but spent the rest of his career at lower levels. In December 2004 he returned to second-from-bottom Varzim on an 18-month deal, losing his job in late February 2007 after a run of ten matches without a win.

After four years with Asteras Tripolis F.C. of Super League Greece – mostly in additional roles with just four games as manager – Gonçalves returned to Portugal's second tier with Leixões S.C. in February 2012. He left the tenth-placed side in November to return to the Eastern Mediterranean, with AEP Paphos FC in the Cypriot First Division; his spell there was only for three weeks.

Gonçalves came back to Portugal's division two with C.D. Santa Clara, a second stint at Leixões, and S.C. Farense. In February 2017 he took over at F.C. Felgueiras 1932, his first job at the third tier in over 15 years.

In mid-2018, Gonçalves moved abroad again to CD Costa do Sol in Mozambique, succeeding the Argentne Leonardo Costas. In 2019, they won the Moçambola, Taça de Moçambique, Supertaça de Mozambique and the Maputo Top 8 Tournament.

Gonçalves was appointed manager of Mozambique in April 2021, on a 2-year contract. His team came fourth at the 2021 COSAFA Cup in South Africa. On 19 October, however, after losses against Cameroon in the 2022 FIFA World Cup qualifiers, his two-year contract was terminated.

References

External links

1962 births
Living people
Sportspeople from Guimarães
Portuguese footballers
Association football forwards
Primeira Liga players
Liga Portugal 2 players
Segunda Divisão players
AD Fafe players
F.C. Famalicão players
Vitória S.C. players
S.C. Olhanense players
Varzim S.C. players
Louletano D.C. players
U.D. Oliveirense players
Portuguese football managers
Primeira Liga managers
Liga Portugal 2 managers
Varzim S.C. managers
G.D. Chaves managers
F.C. Maia managers
S.C. Olhanense managers
Rio Ave F.C. managers
Leixões S.C. managers
C.D. Santa Clara managers
S.C. Farense managers
Super League Greece managers
Asteras Tripolis F.C. managers
Cypriot First Division managers
AEP Paphos FC managers
Mozambique national football team managers
Portuguese expatriate football managers
Expatriate football managers in Greece
Expatriate football managers in Cyprus
Expatriate football managers in Mozambique
Portuguese expatriate sportspeople in Greece
Portuguese expatriate sportspeople in Cyprus
Portuguese expatriate sportspeople in Mozambique